Navab is a surname. Notable people with the surname include:

Abulhassan Navab (born 1958), Iranian cleric
Alex Navab (1965–2019), American financier
Farhan Navab (born 1956), Iranian sprinter
Hossein Navab (1897–1972), Iranian diplomat